Moon Ikjeom (korean:문익점;文益漸, 8 February 132913 June 1398) was a politician of the Goryeo Dynasty and a Neo-Confucian scholar. His given name was Ikcheom (익첨 益瞻), his courtesy name was Ilsin (일신 日新), and his pennames were Saeun (사은 思隱) and Samudang(삼우당 三憂堂).

History
Moon Ikjeom was born in Gangseong village(modern day Sancheong County) in 1329. His father was Moon Sook-sun, who had passed the civil service examination but did not work for the government. Ik-chom started working for the government as a historical recorder in 1360. In 1363, he went to Yuan China as an ambassador for cultural exchange. On the way back to Korea he stole cottonseed in his writing brush cap to bring it secretly into Korea. In 1364, he went back to his home town Jinju to spread the seed and successfully grew one of the seeds he had brought back and continued to grow the number of plants significantly. Within ten years, Korea was able to produce cotton and was able to distribute it to the citizens. He died in 1398.

Works 
 Samudangsilki (삼우당실기 三憂堂實記)

See also 
 Choe Museon

References

 Kim Haboush, JaHyun and Martina Deuchler (1999). Culture and the State in Late Chosŏn Korea.  Cambridge: Harvard University Press. ; OCLC 40926015
 Lee, Peter H. (1993). Sourcebook of Korean Civilization, Vol.  1. New York: Columbia University Press. ; ; ; OCLC 26353271
 Noh, Daehwan. "The Eclectic Development of Neo-Confucianism and Statecraft from the 18th to the 19th Century," Korea Journal. Winter 2003.
 朝鮮王朝實錄太祖 14卷, 7年(1398 戊寅 / 洪武31年) 6月 13日(丁巳)

1329 births
1400 deaths
Neo-Confucian scholars
Korean educators
Historians of Korea
Korean Confucianists
14th-century Korean philosophers